Eobard Thawne, also known as the Reverse-Flash, is a character in The CW's Arrowverse media franchise. Based on the DC Comics supervillain of the same name, he is primarily portrayed by Tom Cavanagh and Matt Letscher. Letscher plays the character's original likeness, while Cavanagh portrays him in the form of Harrison Wells. Thawne first appeared in the pilot episode of the television series The Flash, and has been featured in various spin-off shows and crossover events set in the shared universe. As in the comics, Thawne is depicted as a scientist-turned-time traveling criminal from the future and the archenemy of Barry Allen / The Flash.

Storylines

Origins 
In the 22nd century, Professor Eobard Thawne is a scientist obsessed with a speedster known as the Flash. Thawne manages to recreate the accident behind the Flash's super-speed, tapping into his own "negative" version of the Speed Force. He becomes bitter and jealous when his idol, having traveled through time, saves a crowd that Thawne had intended to rescue. Thawne ultimately grows to despise his former hero upon traveling through time and learning that he was destined to be the Flash's greatest and most feared enemy, and Thawne vows as the Reverse-Flash to be the "reverse" of everything the Flash stands for. At some point, Thawne travels to the year 2016 and finally learns what time the Flash is from. The Reverse-Flash and the Flash battle each other across centuries, with both speedsters equally matched and neither ever prevailing.

Creating the Flash 

Thawne eventually learns of the Flash's secret identity – Barry Allen – and travels to the year 2000 to kill Barry as a child. When his plan fails, Thawne kills Nora Allen and frames Henry Allen instead so that the Flash would never exist. In doing so, Thawne inadvertently severs his own connection to the Speed Force, stranding himself in the 21st century. He murders and assumes the identity of Dr. Harrison Wells to found S.T.A.R. Labs, and spends the next 14 years building a particle accelerator with the intention of creating the Flash ahead of schedule. As Wells, he mentors Barry in defeating metahuman criminals created by the explosion of the particle accelerator and helps to increase his protege's speed, hoping to use Barry's pure connection to the Speed Force as a means for Thawne to return to his own time. Thawne also taunts and bests Barry in combat as the Reverse-Flash to push Barry into getting faster.

After his secret is discovered, Barry captures Thawne with the help of Oliver Queen, Ronnie Raymond, and Martin Stein. Thawne offers Barry a chance to travel back in time to save the Allens in exchange for a time machine to return to the future once the Speed Force wormhole is open. Barry ultimately refuses and destroys Thawne's machine. Before Thawne can kill Barry, one of Thawne's ancestors, police detective Eddie Thawne, shoots himself, which seemingly erases Thawne from existence. A flash drive containing his will as Wells both bequeaths S.T.A.R. Labs to Barry and includes a video-recorded confession to Nora's murder, which allows for Henry's exoneration. This period in which Thawne masquerades as Wells appears occasionally, usually because Barry travels back in time to seek Thawne's help.

Crisis on Earth-X 

Thawne survives his erasure following Eddie's sacrifice because of his connection to the Negative Speed Force, which is immune to timeline changes. He allies with Dark Arrow and Overgirl of the Nazi-dominated Earth-X to invade Earth-1. During their final battle, Barry defeats Thawne but spares his life. Thawne speeds off while his allies are killed.

Imprisonment in 2049 

Thawne is captured and imprisoned in Iron Heights Penitentiary in 2034. He is sentenced to death and routinely tortured by a corrupt prison guard while a dagger that had belonged to the metahuman serial killer Cicada dampens his super-speed. In 2049, Barry and Iris West-Allen's future daughter, Nora West-Allen, seeks Thawne's help in solving a police case and controlling her own newly discovered super-speed. Thawne becomes Nora's mentor and claims that he seeks to create a more noble legacy for himself before his execution, but he actually plans to destroy Cicada's dagger and escape Iron Heights, so he sends Nora to travel back in time and help Barry defeat Cicada. Thawne's plan succeeds as the dagger is destroyed, freeing him moments before his execution in 2049. He briefly fights Barry, Nora, and Team Flash before Nora begins fading from existence because of the changes in the timeline. After Barry witnesses Nora's temporal erasure, Thawne makes his escape.

New multiverse 

Thawne becomes a being of negative tachyons and is fused with Harrison Nash Wells following the multiversal Crisis, after which Nash becomes the 'repository' for the consciousness of every version of Wells, which includes Thawne because of his time spent as Wells. Thawne can control Nash's body, but Barry captures Nash and imprisons him in S.T.A.R. Labs. Before Thawne can regain his connection to the Negative Speed Force, Team Flash expels him from Nash, leaving him bodiless.

Barry and Iris later has the Speed Force reconstitute Thawne's corporeal form in exchange for his aid in subduing Godspeed. Thawne double-crosses Barry by incapacitating Godspeed before making an attempt on Barry's life, but Barry easily defeats him. Seeing that Barry is now faster than him, Thawne vows revenge and flees.

Armageddon and final showdown 

To seize control of Barry's life as revenge, Thawne uses the Negative Still Force to alter the timeline and create a "Reverse-Flashpoint" reality in which he is the Flash and Barry is the Reverse-Flash. Barry uncovers Thawne's machinations and reconnects to the Speed Force to avert the impending "Armageddon" and restore the timeline, causing Thawne to begin fading from existence. To save Thawne's life, Barry strips him of his powers and has him remanded into A.R.G.U.S. custody.

Incarcerated in a supermax prison on Lian Yu, Thawne is visited by John Diggle who seeks his help in unlocking a mysterious cube. Seeing it as a chance to escape, Thawne helps open it but is frustrated when Diggle declines its power. The Negative Still Force materializes in Thawne's cell, seeking to restore him as the Negative Speed Force's avatar after Barry severed his connection to it. To that end, Thawne is aged to death before Iris is sacrificed so that he can be "resurrected" in his redeemed time remnant's body, allowing him to be the Reverse-Flash once again.

After taunting Barry, Thawne goes into the Negative Speed Force and absorbs the powers of the other Negative Forces, which transforms him into their avatar. Thawne attacks Central City and kills dozens of civilians until Barry absorbs the powers of all the Positive Forces to be Thawne's equal. The two speedsters engage in a battle that threatens to bring about Armageddon and destroy the city. Realizing that neither of them will ever win, Barry surrenders and tricks Thawne into unleashing the full power of the Negative Forces, only to redirect the negative energy back into him, destroying Thawne for good.

Other versions

Time remnant 

After losing his father to Zoom, Barry decides to travel back in time and save his mother from Thawne, creating an alternate "Flashpoint" timeline in which Thawne is imprisoned. Barry realized the mistake in manipulating time and releases Thawne and allows him to kill Nora to restore the timeline.

Once he escapes the Flashpoint timeline, Thawne enters a nullified state of existence as a time remnant, causing him to be hunted by the Black Flash, the Speed Force's demonic enforcer. Seeking to cement his existence, Thawne forms a legion of villains to locate the fabled Spear of Destiny. While Thawne and his co-conspirators succeed in using the Spear of Destiny to rewrite reality to their whims, the Legends travel back in time to de-power the holy object, causing him to be vaporized by the Black Flash.

Sometime later, the Speed Force brings Thawne back to life, removes his powers and assigns him to defend the assassination of Archduke Franz Ferdinand – a "fixed point" in history – from time travelers. When the Legends visit the fixed point to attract an evil Gideon's attention, Thawne decides to aid the group. Thawne is then killed by Sara Lance's android doppelgänger, after which Nate Heywood's android doppelgänger is tricked in taking his place as the fixed point's defender.

As a reward for his sacrifice in protecting the timeline, Thawne is offered an opportunity for redemption when he is resurrected by the Speed Force without his memories. Feeling inexplicably compelled to be a speedster again, he works with Dr. Meena Dhawan, CEO of Fast Track Labs, to create an artificial Speed Force device. Thawne falls in love with Meena and sacrifices his dream when he uses their invention to save Meena's life via super-speed after she suffers a cardiac arrest, inadvertently connecting her to the Negative Speed Force. Thawne later works with Barry to free Meena from its corruption. When the Negative Forces threaten to kill Thawne, Barry teaches Meena to temporarily give him super-speed and the three confront the Negative Forces. Unfortunately, he is sacrificed so that his original timeline self can be revived, much to Meena's horror.

Concept and creation 
On February 10, 2014, Tom Cavanagh was set to join The Flash as Harrison Wells. The producers of the show said the following about the character: 'There's obviously more that meets the eye when you see Harrison Wells. ... His motivations are a big mystery, and tracking that through has been a very interesting ride with Mr. Cavanagh.' In episode 15 of the series, Cavanagh was revealed to be playing Eobard Thawne. Regarding this, co-creator Andrew Kreisberg said: "There are the people who read the comics and know everything, and then there are the people who know nothing and you have to make the show for both of those people and that's one of the things we did very early on: oh, if we name Eddie 'Eddie Thawne' then immediately a whole bunch of comic book fans are going to go 'obviously he's the Reverse Flash,' so I get it and hopefully they were surprised when that turned out not to be the case". Two episodes later featured the debut of Matt Letscher in the role, which shocked viewers. The executive producers had not planned this twist from the start, with Kreisberg saying, 'We were talking about, 'well what if Wells wasn't Wells? What if he stole Wells' body?' While Cavanagh would continue playing Thawne on The Flash, Letscher subsequently went on to portray a time-displaced version of the character in Legends of Tomorrow.

Character development

Characterization 
Cavanagh has stated many times that he enjoys playing the character of Eobard Thawne as the character is interesting, complex, and challenging. When speaking with the Television Academy about playing Thawne he said: 'The Reverse Flash has what I like to a call timeless way of speaking. He doesn't use colloquialisms from 2016, he's a little more formal, and he takes joy in destroying people. He has a larger perspective because he comes from 100-plus years in the future and has seen it all. It's easy to play a character like that. He's the arch in arch-villain.' He also sat down with Rolling Stone to discuss his supervillain voice in which he said: "If you're doing it right, you can be charismatic, you can win people over, and you can have so much fun. You build a cage and then you just rattle that cage more than the leading guy can a lot." Kreisberg insisted that Thawne was not evil because his fatherly affection for Cisco was genuine, and "he has a reason for doing what he's doing and he has an agenda and he thinks of himself as the hero ... bad people are capable of incredible amounts of kindness and generosity". Though Thawne is frequently shown to return from death throughout his appearances, Eric Wallace (The Flash showrunner since 2019) intended for his death in the season eight finale to be permanent. However, Letscher has been announced to be returning as the character in the show's ninth and final season, as Wallace stated that they wished to bring Letscher one more time for a "bittersweet" episode featuring Thawne.

Costume 
When asked by the Television Academy about wearing the Reverse-Flash suit, Cavanagh replied with "That's a lot of what acting is.  Often times, you're tapping into the things you did as a youth. You pretended. A lot of us pretended to be Batman, to be our favorite super-hero. A lot of times, you pretended to have the power of imagination at your side. And the first time you put it on, the cameras are rolling, and off you go at superspeed. I've gotten to do some great, great thrilling stunts in the suit. It is a dream come true. I understand that it's a job, and I'm getting paid, but the second that a director yells, "Action", all that disappears, and you're a guy in a supersuit. It's extremely thrilling. I've said before that I wish that anyone who is a legitimate comic book fan could have this opportunity. It really feels like a privilege." Cavanagh also said "I benefited from all the trial and error that went into that. ... I think they did a marvelous job with the suit, I'm always very flattered and honored to put it on," when speaking with Access Hollywood.

Reception

Critical response 
Forbes praised Cavanagh for his role in The Flash season 1 with Erik Kain stating he "is uncanny, a perfect fit for the ominous yet likable villain. All his lines and statements connect with audiences precisely because of how well Cavanagh pulls off the role, and how well that role is written." Collider chose Tom Cavanagh as the Best TV Actor of the Week on May 18, 2015. Rotten Tomatoes ranked Tom Cavanagh's Reverse Flash as the Scariest Character on Comic Book Television as of November 2019. Chancellor Agard from Entertainment Weekly wrote "No matter how many ups and downs The Flash has had over its run, it has never faltered when it comes to its characterization of Thawne."

Accolades 
The Flashs Eobard Thawne was ranked number 35 on Rolling Stones list of the 40 Greatest TV Villains of All Time. He also topped Entertainment Weeklys list of 20 "best" villains on superhero TV in 2015, and was included on Collider's list of Best TV Villains of 2015. Cavanagh received an IGN Awards nomination for Best TV Villain for his portrayal of the character in The Flash. He was also nominated for Choice TV Villain at the 2015 Teen Choice Awards. Screen Rants Jason Berman ranked Cavanagh fifth on his 2016 list 20 Best Actors in the Arrowverse. The entertainment website Collider chose Tom Cavanagh as the Best TV Actor of the Week on May 18, 2015.

Other appearances 
 Cavanagh voiced Thawne masquerading as Wells in "Ants on a Hamburger" of Robot Chicken.

References 

Arrow (TV series) characters
Crossover characters in television
DC Comics characters who can move at superhuman speeds
DC Comics metahumans
DC Comics scientists
DC Comics television characters
Fictional characters who can manipulate time
Fictional characters who can duplicate themselves
Fictional characters who can turn intangible
Fictional impostors
Fictional murderers
Fictional physicists
Fictional prisoners and detainees in the United States
Fictional shapeshifters
Legends of Tomorrow characters
Male characters in television
Supergirl (TV series) characters
Television characters introduced in 2014
The Flash (2014 TV series) characters
Time travelers
Television supervillains